Animals is the tenth studio album by the English rock band Pink Floyd, released on 21 January 1977 through Harvest Records and Columbia Records. It was self-produced at Pink Floyd's Britannia Row Studios in London throughout 1976. The album continued the longform compositions that made up their previous works, including Wish You Were Here (1975).

Animals is both a progressive rock album and a concept album, focusing on the social-political conditions of mid-1970s Britain, and was a change from the style of Pink Floyd's work. Tension within the band during production culminated in keyboardist Richard Wright being fired two years later. The album's cover, conceived by the band's bassist and lead songwriter Roger Waters and designed by long-time collaborator Storm Thorgerson, shows an inflatable pig floating between two chimneys of Battersea Power Station.

Pink Floyd released no singles from Animals but promoted it through the In the Flesh tour. Waters' agitation with audiences during this tour inspired their next album, The Wall (1979). Animals reached number 2 in the UK and number 3 in the US. It initially received mixed reviews, but gained more favourable reviews in later years, and is considered one of the band's best works.

Recording
In 1975, Pink Floyd bought a three-storey block of church halls at 35 Britannia Row in Islington, north London. Their deal with Harvest Records' parent company EMI for unlimited studio time in return for a reduced percentage of sales had expired, and they converted the building into a recording studio and storage facility. Its construction took up most of 1975, and in April 1976 the band started work on their tenth studio album, Animals, at the new facility.

Animals was engineered by a previous Floyd collaborator, Brian Humphries, and recording took place at Britannia Row from April to December 1976, continuing into early 1977.  "Raving and Drooling" and "You've Got to Be Crazy", two songs previously performed live and considered for Wish You Were Here, reappeared as "Sheep" and "Dogs" respectively. They were reworked to fit the new concept, and separated by a Waters-penned composition, "Pigs (Three Different Ones)".  The only other new composition, "Pigs On The Wing" (split into two parts to start and end the album), contains references to Waters' private life; his new romantic interest was Carolyne Anne Christie (who was married to Rock Scully, manager of the Grateful Dead, when she met Waters). With the exception of "Dogs" (co-written by David Gilmour) the album's five tracks were written by Waters. Gilmour was distracted by the birth of his first child, and contributed little else towards the songwriting of the album. Similarly, neither Mason nor Wright contributed as much as they had on previous albums, and Animals was the first Pink Floyd album not to contain a composer's credit for Wright.

The band had discussed employing another guitarist for future tours, and Snowy White was invited into the studio. When Waters and Mason inadvertently erased one of Gilmour's completed guitar solos, White was asked to record a solo on "Pigs on the Wing". Although his performance was omitted from the vinyl release, it was included on the 8-track cartridge version. White performed on the Animals tour. Mason recalled that he enjoyed working on Animals more than Wish You Were Here.

Concept
Loosely based on George Orwell's political fable Animal Farm, the album's lyrics describe various classes in society as different kinds of animals: the predatory dogs, the despotic ruthless pigs, and the "mindless and unquestioning” herd of sheep. Whereas the novella focuses on Stalinism, the album is a critique of capitalism and differs again in that the sheep eventually rise up to overpower the dogs. The album was developed from a collection of unrelated songs into a concept which, in the words of author Glenn Povey, "described the apparent social and moral decay of society, likening the human condition to that of mere animals".

Apart from its critique of capitalist society, the album is also a part response to the punk rock movement, which grew in popularity as a nihilistic statement against the prevailing social and political conditions, and also a reaction to the general complacency and nostalgia that appeared to surround rock music.  Pink Floyd were an obvious target for punk musicians, notably Johnny Rotten of The Sex Pistols, who wore a Pink Floyd T-shirt on which the words "I hate" had been written in ink. Rotten has constantly said it was done for a laugh (he was a fan of several progressive rock bands of the era, including Magma and Van Der Graaf Generator).  Drummer Nick Mason later stated that he welcomed the "Punk Rock insurrection" and viewed it as a welcome return to the underground scene from which Pink Floyd originated.  In 1977, he produced The Damned's second album, Music for Pleasure, at Britannia Row, after they failed to entice the retired Syd Barrett to the role.

In his 2008 book Comfortably Numb, author Mark Blake argues that "Dogs" contains some of David Gilmour's finest work; although the guitarist sings only one lead vocal, his performance is "explosive". The song also contains notable contributions from Wright, which echo the synthesizer sounds used on the band's previous album, Wish You Were Here.

"Pigs (Three Different Ones)" is audibly similar to "Have a Cigar", with bluesy guitar fills and elaborate bass lines.  Of the song's three pigs, the only one directly identified is morality campaigner Mary Whitehouse, who amongst other things is described as a "house-proud town mouse".

"Sheep" contains a modified version of Psalm 23, which continues the traditional "The Lord is my shepherd" with words like "he maketh me to hang on hooks in high places and converteth me to lamb cutlets".  Towards the end of the song, the eponymous sheep rise up and kill the dogs, and later retire back to their homes. Wright played the song's introduction unaccompanied on the electric piano, but did not receive a writing credit for it.

The album is book-ended by each half of "Pigs on the Wing", a simple love song in which a glimmer of hope is offered despite the anger expressed in the album's other three songs. Described by author Andy Mabbett as "[sitting] in stark contrast to the heavyweight material between them", the two halves of the song were heavily influenced by Waters' relationship with his then wife.

Packaging

Once the album was complete, work began on its cover. Hipgnosis, designer of the band's previous album covers, offered three ideas, one of which was a small child entering his parents' bedroom to find them having sex: "copulating, like animals!" The final concept was, unusually, designed by Waters. At the time he lived near Clapham Common, and regularly drove past Battersea Power Station, which was by then approaching the end of its useful life. A view of the building was chosen for the cover image, and the band commissioned German company Ballon Fabrik (who had previously constructed Zeppelin airships) and Australian artist Jeffrey Shaw to build a  pig balloon (known as Algie). The balloon was inflated with helium and manoeuvred into position on 2 December 1976, with a marksman ready to fire if it escaped. Inclement weather delayed work, and the band's manager Steve O'Rourke neglected to book the marksman for a second day; the balloon broke free of its moorings and disappeared from view. The pig flew over Heathrow, resulting in panic and cancelled flights; pilots also spotted the pig in the air. It eventually landed in Kent and was recovered by a local farmer, who was apparently furious that it had scared his cows. The balloon was recovered and filming continued for a third day, but as the early photographs of the power station were considered better, the image of the pig was later superimposed onto one of those taken by professional photographer Howard Bartrop on location on a residential block of flats adjacent.

During the Isles of Wonder short film shot by Danny Boyle and shown as part of the Opening Ceremonies of the 2012 Summer Olympics in London, the camera zooms down the length of the River Thames, from a small spring in the countryside all the way to the Olympic venue. During the fly-by, a pig can be seen floating above Battersea Power Station.

The album's theme continues onto the record's picture labels.  Side one's label shows a fisheye lens view of a dog and the English countryside, and side two features a pig and sheep, in the same setting.  Mason's handwriting is used as a typeface throughout the packaging.  The gatefold features monochrome photographs of the dereliction around the power station.

Release
The album's release followed Capital Radio's broadcast two days earlier of The Pink Floyd Story, and an evening press conference held at the power station two days before that. The broadcast was originally to have been an exclusive for the DJ Nicky Horne, who since mid-December had been broadcasting The Pink Floyd Story, but a copy was given to John Peel, who played side one of the album in its entirety a day earlier.

Animals was released in the UK on 21 January 1977 on Harvest Records, and in the US on 12 February on Columbia Records. It reached number two in the UK and number three in the US. Thanks to the album and the band's back catalogue, according to The Guinness Book of British Hit Albums, "Pink Floyd bested ABBA for most weeks on chart [in 1977], 108 to 106." Animals was certified quadruple platinum in the US on 31 January 1995.

Tour 
The album became the subject material for the band's In the Flesh Tour, which began in Dortmund on the same day the album was released. The tour continued through continental Europe in February, the UK in March, the United States for three weeks in April and May, and another three weeks in the United States in June and July. Algie became the inspiration for a number of pig themes used throughout. An inflatable pig was floated over the audience, and during each performance was replaced with a cheaper, but explosive version. On one occasion the mild propane gas was replaced with an oxygen-acetylene mixture, producing a massive (and dangerous) explosion. German promoter Marcel Avram presented the band with a piglet in Munich, only for it to leave a trail of broken mirrors and excrement across its mirrored hotel room, leaving manager O'Rourke to deal with the resulting fallout.

The band was augmented by familiar figures such as Dick Parry and Snowy White, but relations within the band became fraught. Waters took to arriving at the venues alone, departing as soon as each performance was over. On one occasion, Wright flew back to England, threatening to leave the band. The size of the venues was also an issue; in Chicago, the promoters claimed to have sold out the 67,000-person regular capacity of the Soldier Field stadium (after which ticket sales should have been ended), but Waters and O'Rourke were suspicious. They hired a helicopter, photographer and attorney, and discovered that the actual attendance was 95,000; a shortfall to the band of $640,000. The end of the tour was a low point for Gilmour, who felt that the band had by now achieved the success the members had originally sought, and that there was nothing else they could look forward to. In July 1977 – on the final date at the Montreal Olympic Stadium – a small group of noisy and excited fans in the front row of the audience irritated Waters to such an extent that he spat at one of them. He was not the only person who felt depressed about playing to such large audiences, as Gilmour refused to join his bandmates for their third encore.  Waters later spoke with producer Bob Ezrin and told him of his sense of alienation on the tour, and how he sometimes felt like building a wall to separate himself from the audience.  The spitting incident would later form the basis of a new concept, which would eventually become one of the band's most successful album releases, The Wall.

Reviews 
NME called Animals "one of the most extreme, relentless, harrowing and downright iconoclastic hunks of music to have been made available this side of the sun", and Melody Maker Karl Dallas described it as an "uncomfortable taste of reality in a medium that has become in recent years, increasingly soporific".  Rolling Stone Frank Rose was unimpressed, writing: "The 1977 Floyd has turned bitter and morose.  They complain about the duplicity of human behavior (and then title their songs after animals – get it?).  They sound like they've just discovered this – their message has become pointless and tedious." Robert Christgau of The Village Voice gave the album a "B+" rating and found the negative reaction overly cynical, reasoning that the album functions simply as "a piece of well-constructed political program music ... lyrical, ugly, and rousing, all in the right places".

Legacy 
In his 2004 autobiography Inside Out, Mason wrote that the album's perceived harshness, compared to previous Floyd releases, might have been the result of a "workman-like mood in the studio", and an unconscious reaction to accusations from some punk artists that bands like Pink Floyd represented "dinosaur rock".  

Gilmour said on Westwood One's Pink Floyd 25th Anniversary Special about the album: "It wasn't one of the more productive periods of our life I don't think. We used those two tracks which went back to '74, changed the names, doctored them around and stuck them on the album. It was a great, I love the album, it was exciting and noisy and fun. It really had some great bits and stuff of effects on there but it was not one of our creative high points really." Wright, on the BBC Omnibus Special in 1994, said: "I didn't really like a lot of the music on the album. I didn't fight hard to put my stuff on the album and I didn't have anything to put on. I played well but did not contribute to the writing and also Roger was not letting me write. This was the whole start of the whole ego thing in the band, Animals."

Reissues 
Animals was issued on CD in 1985, and in the US in 1987.  It was reissued as a digitally remastered CD with new artwork in 1994, and as a digitally remastered limited-edition vinyl album in 1997.  An anniversary edition was released in the US in the same year, followed in 2000 by a reissue from Capitol Records. It was also included in the Shine On box set in 1992, in the 2007 Oh, By The Way box set and in the 2011 Why Pink Floyd...? re-release series both in the box set and as a standalone 'Discovery' edition CD.

In an April 2020 interview, Waters said he had pushed for the release of a remixed and remastered vinyl of Animals by James Guthrie, but that it had been rejected by Gilmour and Mason. In June 2021, Waters released a statement announcing a new release with stereo and 5.1 surround mixes. Waters cited a dispute between himself and Gilmour over a set of liner notes written by Mark Blake as the reason for the delay, and posted the rejected liner notes on his website. The remix was released on 16 September 2022, on vinyl, CD, & Blu-ray; a limited edition deluxe gatefold package containing the vinyl, CD, Blu-ray, and DVD copies of the remix and a 32-page book was released on 7 October 2022. A hybrid multichannel SACD of the stereo and surround remixes was released exclusively through Acoustic Sounds on 16 September 2022. The band released the 2018 remix of "Dogs" as a digital single on 22 July 2022. The reissue charted at number 21 on the Billboard 200 (its highest position since March, 1977).

Track listing
All tracks written and all lead vocals performed by Roger Waters, except "Dogs", written and sung by both Waters and David Gilmour.

Personnel
Track numbers noted in parenthesis below are based on CD track numbering.

Pink Floyd
Richard Wright – Hammond organ , ARP string synthesizer , Fender Rhodes , Minimoog , Farfisa organ , piano , clavinet , EMS VCS 3 , harmony vocals 
David Gilmour – lead vocals , lead guitar , bass guitar , acoustic guitar , talk box 
Roger Waters – lead vocals , harmony vocals , acoustic guitar , rhythm guitar , bass guitar , tape effects , vocoder , sleeve concept
Nick Mason – drums, percussion , tape effects , graphics

Additional musicians
Snowy White – guitar solo (on 8-track version of "Pigs on the Wing")

Production
Pink Floyd – music producers
Brian Humphries – engineering
Storm Thorgerson – sleeve design (organiser)
Aubrey Powell – sleeve design (organiser), photography
Peter Christopherson – photography
Howard Bartrop – cover photography
Nic Tucker – photography
Bob Ellis – photography
Rob Brimson – aerial photography
Colin Jones – photography
E.R.G. Amsterdam – inflatable pig design
Doug Sax, James Guthrie – 1992 remastering at The Mastering Lab
James Guthrie, Joel Plante – 2011 remastering at das boot recording

Charts

Weekly charts

Year-end charts

Certifications

See also
Live Frogs Set 2

References
Notes

Footnotes

Bibliography

Further reading

External links

 
 pinkfloydz for Animals 2018 track listing

1977 albums
Albums produced by David Gilmour
Albums produced by Nick Mason
Albums produced by Richard Wright (musician)
Albums produced by Roger Waters
Albums with cover art by Hipgnosis
Albums with cover art by Storm Thorgerson
Capitol Records albums
Columbia Records albums
Concept albums
Dystopian music
Political music albums by English artists
EMI Records albums
Harvest Records albums
Pink Floyd albums